Harry Cope (28 January 1881 – 6 November 1947) was an Australian rules footballer who played with Melbourne in the Victorian Football League (VFL).

Notes

External links 

1881 births
Australian rules footballers from Victoria (Australia)
Melbourne Football Club players
1947 deaths